Tyrosyl-tRNA synthetase, cytoplasmic, also known as Tyrosine-tRNA ligase, is an enzyme that in humans is encoded by the YARS gene.

Living cells translate DNA sequences into RNA sequences and then into protein sequences. Proteins are chains of amino acids, such as tyrosine. As the protein grows, each amino acid is added to the end by an enzyme called transfer RNA (tRNA). Each amino acid has its own tRNA, and tyrosyl-tRNA synthetase is the tRNA that adds tyrosine to the end of a growing protein. 

Aminoacyl-tRNA synthetases catalyze the aminoacylation of transfer RNA (tRNA) by their cognate amino acid. Because of their central role in linking amino acids with nucleotide triplets contained in tRNAs, aminoacyl-tRNA synthetases are thought to be among the first proteins that appeared in evolution. Tyrosyl-tRNA synthetase belongs to the class I tRNA synthetase family. Cytokine activities have also been observed for the human tyrosyl-tRNA synthetase, after it is split into two parts, an N-terminal fragment that harbors the catalytic site and a C-terminal fragment found only in the mammalian enzyme. The N-terminal fragment is an interleukin-8-like cytokine, whereas the released C-terminal fragment is an EMAP II-like cytokine.

Recently, tyrosyl-tRNA synthetase has been demonstrated as the biologically and functionally significant target for resveratrol.

For a comparison of cytoplasmic human tyrosyl-tRNA synthetase with its mitochondrial counterpart and with tyrosyl-tRNA synthetases of other biological kingdoms and organisms, see the Wikipedia page on Tyrosine-tRNA ligase and a general review on their structures and functions.

References

Further reading

External links